Amtrak Thruway is a system of through-ticketed transportation services to connect passengers with areas not served by Amtrak trains. In most cases these are dedicated motorcoach routes, but can also be non-dedicated intercity bus services, transit buses, vans, taxis, ferry boats and commuter rail trains.

Train and Thruway tickets are typically purchased together from Amtrak for the length of a passenger's journey and connections are timed for guaranteed transfers between the two services.

In addition to providing connecting service to unserved areas, some Thruway services operate as redundant service along passenger rail corridors to add extra capacity.

History and purpose 
Amtrak operates the Thruway network to extend the reach of its train services, offering connections to destinations not directly served by Amtrak trains. The earliest incarnation of such a service was launched in January 1973, to provide a connection between Amtrak's Inter-American in Laredo, Texas, and the Aztec Eagle train run by N de M from Nuevo Laredo, Mexico. The following year, Amtrak launched an agreement with Greyhound allowing for passengers to buy combined bus and rail tickets for connecting services run by the two companies. These services were the predecessors of Thruway Motorcoach. The first Amtrak bus service to bear the name "Amtrak Thruway" was launched in California in 1993. Amtrak launched a significant expansion of Thruway Motorcoach services across the United States in 2014.

Routes

Northeast

Boston to Manchester (Boston Express)
Boston to Concord/Berlin, New Hampshire (through-ticketed Concord Coach Lines route)
Boston to Concord/Littleton, New Hampshire (through-ticketed Concord Coach Lines route)
Boston to Newburyport, Massachusetts/Portsmouth, New Hampshire (through-ticketed C&J route)
New London, Connecticut, to Foxwoods Casino (through-ticketed SEAT route)
Philadelphia to Atlantic City, New Jersey (through-ticketed NJ Transit Atlantic City Line rail route)
Philadelphia to Pottstown/Reading, Pennsylvania (service provided by Krapf Coaches)
Philadelphia to Quakertown/Allentown/White Haven/Wilkes-Barre/Scranton, Pennsylvania (service provided by Martz Trailways)
Washington, D.C. to Charlottesville, Virginia (through-ticketed Greyhound route)
BWI Airport Amtrak station to Kent Island/Easton/Cambridge/Salisbury/Ocean Pines/Ocean City, Maryland (operated by BayRunner Shuttle)
BWI Airport Amtrak station to Frederick/Hagerstown/Cumberland/Grantsville, Maryland (operated by BayRunner Shuttle)
Portland, Maine, to Bangor (through-ticketed Concord Coach Lines route)
Buffalo to Jamestown, New York (through-ticketed Coach USA Erie route)

East
Westport, New York, to Lake Placid, New York (operated by Ground Force 1)
Killington to Rutland (Gramps Shuttle)
DeLand, Florida, to Daytona Beach (thruway service is a taxicab provided by Tri Star Taxi)
Orlando/Tampa to St. Petersburg/Fort Myers, Florida (operated by Martz First Class)
Wilson, North Carolina, to numerous cities in eastern North Carolina (Greenville, New Bern, Havelock, Morehead City, Goldsboro, Kinston, Jacksonville, and Wilmington) (through ticketed motorcoach operated by Southeastern Tours of Greenville).
Charlottesville to Richmond, Virginia (operated by James River Transportation)
High Point, North Carolina, to Winston-Salem (operated by Piedmont Authority for Regional Transportation)
Meridian, Mississippi, to Dallas (through-ticketed Greyhound route)
Harrisburg to Williamsport, Pennsylvania (through-ticketed Fullington Trailways route)
Pittsburgh to State College, Pennsylvania  (through-ticketed Fullington Trailways route)
Pittsburgh to Columbus/Dayton, Ohio/Indianapolis, Indiana (through-ticketed Greyhound route)
Charleston, West Virginia, to numerous cities in northern West Virginia (Sutton/Flatwoods, Weston, Clarksburg, Fairmont & Morgantown) (operated by Barons Bus Lines)

Midwest
Toledo, Ohio, to East Lansing, Michigan, via Detroit and Ann Arbor, Michigan (Trinity Transportation)
Battle Creek, Michigan, to Flint (through-ticketed Indian Trails route)
Kalamazoo, Michigan, to St. Ignace (through-ticketed Indian Trails route)
Kalamazoo, Michigan to Grand Rapids (through-ticketed Indian Trails route)
Kalamazoo, Michigan to Sault Ste. Marie (through-ticketed Indian Trails route)
Kalamazoo, Michigan to Gaylord (through-ticketed Indian Trails route)
Port Huron to Detroit  (Hoosier Ride)
Chicago to Rockford, Illinois/Madison, Wisconsin (through-ticketed Van Galder Bus Company route)
Indianapolis to Galesburg, Illinois/Davenport, Iowa (through-ticketed Burlington Trailways route)
Chicago/Indianapolis to Louisville, Kentucky (through-ticketed Greyhound route)
Carbondale, Illinois, to St. Louis (Vandalia Bus Lines)
New Orleans to Baton Rouge (Greyhound Lines)
Kansas City, Missouri, to Oklahoma City via Tulsa (through-ticketed Jefferson Lines route)
Milwaukee to Oshkosh, Wisconsin/Wausau, Wisconsin (through-ticketed Lamers Bus Lines route)
Milwaukee to Green Bay, Wisconsin, via Appleton, Oshkosh and Fond du Lac 
Milwaukee to Madison, Wisconsin (Badger Bus)
Milwaukee to Houghton, Michigan (Indian Trails)
Milwaukee to Minneapolis/St. Paul via Eau Claire, Wisconsin (Jefferson Lines)
Galesburg, Illinois, to Springfield, Illinois
St. Paul-Minneapolis to Duluth, Minnesota (through-ticketed Jefferson Lines route)
Newton, Kansas, to Oklahoma City via Wichita.
Toledo, Ohio, to Chicago, Illinois

West
Albuquerque to El Paso (through-ticketed Greyhound route)
Denver to Colorado Springs/Pueblo (through-ticketed Greyhound route)
Denver to Glenwood Springs, Colorado (through-ticketed Greyhound route)
Denver to Buffalo, Wyoming (through-ticketed Express Arrow route)
Flagstaff to Williams/Grand Canyon (through-ticketed Groome route)
Flagstaff to Phoenix (through-ticketed Groome or Greyhound route)
Flagstaff to Sedona (through-ticketed Groome route)
Kingman to Laughlin, NV and Las Vegas, NV (through-ticketed Vegas Airporter route)
Lamy, New Mexico, to Santa Fe, New Mexico
Longview, Texas, to Shreveport, Louisiana
Longview to Houston/Galveston
Houston to Galveston (through-ticketed Kerrville Bus route)
Maricopa to Phoenix (through-ticketed Stagecoach Express route)
Oklahoma City to Kansas City, Missouri, via Tulsa (through-ticketed Jefferson Lines route)
Raton, New Mexico, to Denver (through-ticketed Greyhound route)
Salt Lake City to Boise (through-ticketed Greyhound route)
Salt Lake City to Las Vegas via St. George (through-ticketed Greyhound route)
San Antonio to Laredo (through-ticketed Greyhound route)
San Antonio to McAllen (through-ticketed Greyhound route)
Temple to Killeen/Fort Hood

Pacific Northwest
Seattle to Vancouver, British Columbia (through-ticketed Cantrail route)
Seattle to Bellingham and Vancouver, BC
Seattle to Vancouver Island/Victoria, British Columbia (through-ticketed Victoria Clipper ferry route)
Portland to Eugene-Springfield (through-ticketed POINT route)
Portland to Astoria (through-ticketed POINT route)
Spokane to Boise (through-ticketed Northwestern Trailways route)
Seattle to Wenatchee/Spokane (through-ticketed Northwestern Trailways route)
Portland to Pendleton/Boise (through-ticketed Greyhound route)
Portland/Albany to Corvallis/Newport (through-ticketed Valley Retriever route)
Redmond to Chemult (operated by TAC Transportation)
Klamath Falls to Brookings (through-ticketed POINT route)
Eugene to Bend/Ontario (through-ticketed POINT route)
Eugene to Coos Bay (operated by TAC Transportation)
Klamath Falls to Ashland

California

 Route 1: Bakersfield – Los Angeles – Santa Ana – San Diego
 Route 1C: Bakersfield – Burbank Airport – Westwood/UCLA – Santa Monica
 Route 3: Redding – Chico – Sacramento – Stockton
 Route 4: Los Angeles – Santa Barbara – Goleta
 Route 6: Stockton – San Jose – Santa Cruz (some Stockton – San Jose services operated by Altamont Corridor Express trains, San Jose – Santa Cruz operated as Highway 17 Express by Santa Cruz Metropolitan Transit District)
 Route 7: Martinez – Napa – Santa Rosa – Arcata
 Route 10: Santa Barbara – Bakersfield – Las Vegas, Nevada
 Route 15A: Merced – Yosemite (through-ticketed Yosemite Area Regional Transportation System route)
 Route 15B: Fresno – Yosemite (through-ticketed Yosemite Area Regional Transportation System route)
 Route 17: Oakland – San Luis Obispo – Santa Barbara
 Route 18: Santa Maria – San Luis Obispo – Hanford – Visalia
 Route 19: Bakersfield – Pasadena – Riverside – San Bernardino
 Route 20: Sacramento – South Lake Tahoe (through-ticketed El Dorado Transit route) or Colfax – Reno/Sparks, Nevada
 Route 21: San Jose – San Luis Obispo – Santa Barbara
 Route 39: Fullerton – Palm Springs – Coachella Valley
 Route 99: Oakland/Emeryville – San Francisco

References

External links
Transit Unlimited Profile
Amtrak Thruway Connecting Services

Thruway Motorcoach
Intercity bus companies of the United States
Bus transportation in the United States